The Groover is a live album by the Ramsey Lewis Trio which was recorded at the Lighthouse in 1965 at the same performances that produced the album Hang On Ramsey! but not released on the Cadet label until 1972.

Track listing
 "Summertime" (George Gershwin, Ira Gershwin, DuBose Heyward) - 9:20   
 "Crazy He Calls Me" (Carl Sigman, Bob Russell) - 3:22   
 "Why Don't You Do Right" (Joe McCoy) - 2:52   
 "There Is No Greater Love" (Isham Jones, Marty Symes) - 3:45   
 "Look-A-Here" (Ramsey Lewis) - 7:56   
 "Imagination" (Jimmy Van Heusen, Johnny Burke) - 3:40   
 "Bags' Groove" (Milt Jackson) -  5:05

Personnel 
Ramsey Lewis - piano
Eldee Young - bass
Issac "Red" Holt - drums

References 

1972 live albums
Ramsey Lewis live albums
Cadet Records live albums
Albums produced by Esmond Edwards
Albums recorded at the Lighthouse Café